Dorcopsulus is a genus of small marsupials in the family Macropodidae, known as forest wallabies. They are native to dry forests of New Guinea.

Species 
The genus contains the following species:

 Macleay's dorcopsis (Dorcopsulus macleayi)
 Small dorcopsis (Dorcopsulus vanheurni)

References

External links 
 
 

Macropods
Marsupial genera
Taxa named by Paul Matschie
Taxonomy articles created by Polbot